"Fucken Awesome" is a song by Australian alternative rock band Spiderbait. The song was released in June 2004 as the second and final single from the band's sixth studio album Tonight Alright. The single peaked at number 30 on the Australian chart. The song ranked at number 20 on Triple J's Hottest 100 in 2004.

Track listings

Charts

Release history

References

 

2004 singles
2004 songs
Spiderbait songs
Universal Music Australia singles